An intercalary chapter (also called an inner chapter, inserted chapter, or interchapter) is a chapter in a novel or novella that is relevant to the theme, but does not involve the main characters or further the plot. Intercalary chapters often take the form of vignettes that offer a broader or alternative perspective to the experiences of the main character. They can also be used to provide social and historical background that can't be easily interwoven into the narrative chapters.

Examples
The following novels make use of intercalary chapters:
 American Gods by Neil Gaiman
 Cry, the Beloved Country by Alan Paton
 The Grapes of Wrath, by John Steinbeck
 The Left Hand of Darkness by Ursula K. Le Guin
 Moby-Dick; or, The Whale by Herman Melville
 Tom Jones by Henry Fielding
 War and Peace by Leo Tolstoy
 The Ministry for the Future by Kim Stanley Robinson

References

Narrative techniques
Narratology